Berens River Ojibwe is a dialect of the Ojibwe language spoken along the Berens River in northern Ontario and Manitoba. Berens communities include Pikangikum and Poplar Hill, both in Ontario, well as Little Grand Rapids, in Manitoba. Berens is strongly distinguished from the Severn Ojibwe dialect spoken in communities directly to the north.

Berens River Ojibwe is most commonly written using the Cree syllabary widely used to write Ojibwe in northern Ontario.

Berens River Ojibwe is not included in Ethnologue.

See also
 Little Grand Rapids, Manitoba
 Pikangikum First Nation
 Poplar Hill First Nation

Notes

References

 Gordon Jr., Raymond G., ed., 2005. Ethnologue: Languages of the World, 15th edition. Ethnologue: Languages of the World Dallas: Summer Institute of Linguistics.  
 Nichols, John. 1996. "The Cree syllabary." Peter Daniels and William Bright, eds. The world's writing systems, 599-611. New York: Oxford University Press. 
 Fiero, Charles, with Norman Quill. 1973. Ojibwe Assimilation. Red Lake, ON: Northern Light Gospel Messions.
 Valentine, J. Randolph. 1994. Ojibwe dialect relationships. PhD dissertation, University of Texas, Austin.

Further reading
 Quill, Norman. 1965. Ed. Charles Fiero. The moons of winter and other stories. Red Lake, ON: Northern Light Gospel Mission.
 Quill, Norman. 1990. Ed. Charles Fiero. The moons of winter and other stories. [syllabic edition] Readers and Study Guides. Winnipeg, MB: Algonquian and Iroquoian Linguistics. 

Central Algonquian languages
Ojibwa language, Central
Indigenous languages of the North American eastern woodlands
First Nations languages in Canada